Hasan Hamid Al Moustafa (born 12 September 1984) is a Syrian footballer who plays for Etehad Al Zarqah in the Jordan League Division 1 as a defender.

Career
In the beginning of the season Prayag United of I-League bought Moustafa as their fourth foreigner. He has previously played in Lebanon and Syria.

References

Living people
1984 births
Syrian footballers
I-League players
Expatriate footballers in Jordan
Expatriate footballers in India
Syrian expatriate footballers
United SC players
Association football defenders
Syrian expatriate sportspeople in India